The Banana Islands are a group of islands that lie off the coast of Yawri Bay, south west of the Freetown Peninsula in the Western Area of Sierra Leone.  

Three islands make up the Banana Islands:  Dublin and Ricketts are linked by a stone causeway. The third Mes-Meheux is a privately owned island and used as an adventure tourism destination. 

Dublin Island is known for its beaches, while Ricketts Island is best known for its forests. 

Banana Islands are entirely surrounded by the Freetown peninsula; and the islands are only accessible by boat, ferry and helicopter. The major industries in Banana Islands are fishing and tourism.

History

Diemermeer
In 1747 the Diemermeer, an East Indiaman belonging to the Dutch East India Company was wrecked here.

The Clevlands
William Clevland and a group of fellow sailors were ship wrecked on the Island, and Clevland took the opportunity to declare himself king. This claim was cemented by his marriage to his wife Ndamba, a Kissi woman. During the late 1700s disputes broke into deep violence between the Clevelands of Banana Islands and the Caulkers on Plaintain Islands. This ended in the 1800s when finally the Caulkers succeeded in taking both sets of islands.

Ricketts and Dublin
Dublin and Ricketts Islands have a combined population of about 900 people. The two Islands are connected by a spit of sand that is underwater at high tide. A stone bridge connects the path between the two islands' villages of Dublin and Ricketts, located on the coast facing the Western Peninsula.

The islands were visited in the 17th century and perhaps earlier by Portuguese sailors. They were settled in the late 18th and 19th centuries by freed slaves, mostly from the Americas. Their descendants make up most of the population of the islands today.

Activities
Shipwrecks lie off the coast and in one can be found cannons amongst the ruin and coral. On the northern tip of Dublin Island the ruins of an 1881 church as well as an old slave dock can be found. It is advised that visitors should pay their respects to the tribal chief before wandering around the islands.

Tourist infrastructure exists only in the northern part of the island. “Daltons Banana Guest House” or the “Banana Island Chalets” can arrange transportation to the islands from the nearby town of  Kent.

References

External links

 Adventure tourism Mes-Meheux

 Banana Island travel guide

Bibliography
 Manson K. & Knight J. (2009) Sierra Leone Chalfont St Peter: Bradt Travel Guides

Geography of Freetown
Islands of Sierra Leone